The Foster Gang is a 1964 South African feature film about the Foster gang. It was written and directed by Percival Reubens.

External links
The Foster Gang at IMDb
Foster Gang at BFI

1964 films